Maneybong Dentam Assembly constituency is one of the 32 assembly constituencies of Sikkim, a north east state of India. Maneybong Dentam is part of the Sikkim Lok Sabha constituency, located in the West district of Sikkim.

Members of Legislative Assembly

Election results

2019

See also
 Maneybong
 West Sikkim district
 List of constituencies of Sikkim Legislative Assembly

References

Assembly constituencies of Sikkim
Gyalshing district